Valuyeh or Veluyeh or Voluyeh may refer to:
 Valuyeh-ye Olya
 Valuyeh-ye Sofla